Flavia Rigamonti (born 1 July 1981) is a Swiss swimmer from Sorengo. As of 2010, she holds the Swiss Records in the women's 400, 800 and 1500 freestyles.

At the 2007 World Championships, she set the European Record in the women's 1500 free (15:55.38).

Rigamonti swam in the US for Southern Methodist University. She received the 2005-2006 Scholar Athlete Award in the women's swimming category from Conference USA during her senior year.

References

External links
 Swimming - Flavia Rigamonti (Switzerland)

1981 births
Living people
Swiss female freestyle swimmers
Swimmers at the 2000 Summer Olympics
Swimmers at the 2004 Summer Olympics
Swimmers at the 2008 Summer Olympics
Olympic swimmers of Switzerland
World Aquatics Championships medalists in swimming
Medalists at the FINA World Swimming Championships (25 m)
European Aquatics Championships medalists in swimming
People from Sorengo
SMU Mustangs women's swimmers
Universiade medalists in swimming
Universiade gold medalists for Switzerland
Medalists at the 2007 Summer Universiade
Sportspeople from Ticino
21st-century Swiss women